The Northern Department was a department of the government of the Kingdom of England from 1660 to 1707 and later the Kingdom of Great Britain from 1707 until 1782 when its functions were reorganised into the new Home Office and Foreign Office.

History
The Northern Department, was, together with the Southern Department, responsible for both foreign and domestic affairs. Foreign affairs were split between the two departments on a geographical basis, with the Northern Department taking responsibility for Russia, Sweden, Denmark, Poland, the Netherlands, and the German Holy Roman Empire. Responsibility for domestic affairs was shared between the two departments. After England united with Scotland to form the Kingdom of Great Britain, the two departments also split responsibility for Scottish affairs, except during those times when there was an appointed Secretary of State for Scotland. Responsibility for overseas military strategy was also shared between the two departments.

It was administered by the Secretary of State for the Northern Department.

In 1782, the Northern and Southern Departments were reorganized, with the Foreign Office taking over their foreign responsibilities and the Home Office taking over their domestic responsibilities.

See also
 Secretaries of State for the Northern Department

References

Defunct departments of the Government of the United Kingdom
.
Foreign relations of England
Foreign relations of Great Britain
Governance of England
Northern Department 01
Northern Department 01
Northern Department 01
Northern Department 01
Northern Department 01
Government agencies established in 1660
1660 establishments in England
1782 disestablishments in Great Britain
1660 establishments in the British Empire
1782 disestablishments in the British Empire